St. John the Theologian's Monastery Tower is a tower, remnant of a former monastery, in Cerkovicë, Vlorë County, Albania. It is a Cultural Monument of Albania.

References

Cultural Monuments of Albania
Buildings and structures in Finiq